Chiara Ottaviano, (Ragusa, 1955) is an Italian historian, writer and film director.

Biography

After obtaining a degree in philosophy, at the Università di Catania, thanks to scholarships of Einaudi Foundation of Torino, has done research on social and cultural history in Italy, England and South Africa.

She taught from 1994 at Università di Torino and then History and sociology of mass communication, from 1996 to 2012, at the Politecnico di Torino

With Peppino Ortoleva founded the Cliomedia Officina, a company that operates in the cultural industry in order to combine historical research at the old and new media and directing it since 1985. In addition to several audiovisual history, Cliomedia produced the film documentary Terramatta, a story on the writer illiterate Vincenzo Rabito, presented at the 69th Venice International Film Festival and winner of the Nastro d'Argento for 2013 Best documentary.

Since 2000, she directed the Historical Archives of Telecom Italia.

In 2013, she founded the Archivio degli Iblei, along the lines of Archivio Diaristico Nazionale, and the latter associated in order to enable the digitization of diaries to make them available to scholars, historians and anthropologists.

She has written numerous essays on the history, curatorial essays and prefaces to other historians.

Essays

  Chiara Ottaviano e Peppino Ortoleva, Cronologia della Storia d'Italia 1815–1990, Novara, DeAgostini, 1991, (new edition I giorni della storia d'Italia dal Risorgimento ad oggi, 1995)
  C. Ottaviano e S. Scaramuzzi, Le famiglie e l'adozione dell'innovazione delle nuove tecnologie della comunicazione. I modelli di consumo e la tradizione degli studi, Venezia, 1997
  Chiara Ottaviano, Mezzi per comunicare. Storia, società e affari dal telegrafo al modem, Torino, Paravia, 1997
  Chiara Ottaviano (a cura di), Nuova Storia Universale. I racconti della storia, Torino, Garzanti, 2004–2005 (vol. VI-IX)
  Chiara Ottaviano e G. Dematteis, L'Italia una e diversa, Milano, Touring Editore, 2010

Audiovisual

  Terramatta, film documentary, Cliomedia Officina for Cinecittà Luce, 2012
  La vita quotidiana degli italiani durante il fascismo, Gruner+Jahr/Mondadori, 3 vol. 2005/2007
  Il Mezzogiorno e la storia d'Italia, Formez, 1992
  Tute blu. Il Novecento operaio a Torino, Rai3, 1987
  Torino laboratorio? A proposito degli ottant'anni dell'Unione Industriale, Rai3, 1986
  Sapere la strada. Storia dell'emigrazione biellese, Rai3, 1986
  Le trasformazioni del paesaggio italiano dal 1945 ad oggi, Loescher, 1996

References

1955 births
Living people
20th-century Italian historians
Italian women historians
Historians of Italy
People from Ragusa, Sicily
Writers from the Province of Ragusa
21st-century Italian historians